Qasymbek or  Kasymbek, also written as Kassymbek is a Turkic masculine given name which is common in Kyrgyzstan and Kazakhstan. It is related to the Azerbaijani name . The name derives from Arabic as Qasim, meaning dividing or distributing and Bek which is a Turkic title for tribal chief, making the name's literal meaning as a "dividing ruler".

Given name
 Kasymbek Yeshmambetov (1910–1984), Kyrgyz writer
 Gasim bey Zakir (1784-1857), Azerbaijani poet
 Gasim bey Hajibababeyov (1811-1874), Azerbaijani architect

Surname
 Zhenis Kassymbek (born 1975), Kazakh politician

See also
 Qasim (name)
 Bey

References